Sarah Hartwig (born 12 April 2002) is an Australian rules footballer playing for  in the AFL Women's (AFLW).

Early football

Hartwig was eight when she first began playing Australian rules football in the South Metro Junior Football League (SMJFL), where she played with St Peters Junior Football Club, tallying up a total of 86 games over her 9 years at the club. Hartwig would end up becoming one of 7 SMJFL players drafted into the AFL Women's in the 2020 AFL Women's draft. She played in the School Sports Victoria (SSV) National Championships in the Under 15s division. Hartwig came fifth in the SMJFL's best and fairest voting for the Under 18 Girls 1 Division, behind future players Eliza McNamara, Alana Porter and Winnie Laing.  She played 2 seasons with the Sandringham Dragons, wearing the 25 guernsey. Hartwig also played 12 games with the Dragons in 2019 and 2020, with 9 of those coming in her junior year due to the impact of the COVID-19 pandemic on her senior playing year. She averaged 13.1 disposals in her junior year, and 15.0 in her senior year. Hartwig represented Vic Metro in the 2019 AFL Women's Under 18 Championships, playing 2 games and averaging 5 disposals a game.

AFL career
In her first game, she collected 5 disposals and a mark. It was revealed that Hartwig had signed a contract extension with the club on 16 June 2021, after playing every game possible for the club that season.

Statistics
Statistics are correct to the end of the 2021 season.

|- style="background-color: #eaeaea"
! scope="row" style="text-align:center" | 2021
|style="-*+-*+-+text-align:center;"|
| 15 || 9 || 0 || 0 || 44 || 30 || 74 || 13 || 17 || 0.0 || 0.0 || 4.9 || 3.3 || 8.2 || 1.4 || 1.9 || 
|- 
|- class="sortbottom"
! colspan=3| Career
! 9
! 0
! 0
! 44
! 30
! 74
! 13
! 17
! 0.0
! 0.0
! 4.9
! 3.3
! 8.2
! 1.4
! 1.9
! 0
|}

References

External links

2002 births
Living people
Western Bulldogs (AFLW) players
Sandringham Dragons players (NAB League Girls)
Australian rules footballers from Victoria (Australia)